Tartar District is one of the 66 districts of Azerbaijan. It is located in the west of the country and belongs to the Karabakh Economic Region. The district borders the districts of Kalbajar, Goranboy, Yevlakh, Barda, and Agdam. Its capital and largest city is Tartar. As of 2020, the district had a nominal population of 104,700.

History 
The district was expanded to include the eastern part of the Mardakert District of Nagorno-Karabakh Autonomous Oblast following its abolishment, however only a small part of it remained under the control of Azerbaijan following the First Nagorno-Karabakh war. Azerbaijan recaptured Talish and Madagiz villages of Tartar during the 2020 Nagorno-Karabakh war and the rest of the district was put under the control of the Russian peacekeepers.

Some Azerbaijani IDPs from Nagorno Karabakh and the surrounding occupied regions were moved into tent settlements in the district following the First Nagorno-Karabakh war. Most of them now live in new houses built by the government.

References 

Districts of Azerbaijan
Nagorno-Karabakh